H12 is an important Ukraine national highway (H-highway) in Sumy and Poltava Oblasts, Ukraine, running mainly north–south, and connecting Sumy with Poltava in a more or less straight line.  It begins in Sumy at Bandera Street (Highway H07/Highway P61) and Illinska Street, and travels straight through central Sumy. It passes through Syrovatka, Boromlya, Trostyanets, Klymentove, Okhtyrka, Khukhra, Kotelva, Velyki Budyshcha, and Dykanka, and then loops around Poltava and terminates at the intersection of Highway M03 and Polovky Street.

Main route

See also

 Roads in Ukraine
 Ukraine State Highways

References 

Roads in Sumy Oblast
Roads in Poltava Oblast